Maria Doolaeghe (25 October 1803 – 7 April 1884) was a Flemish writer.

Bibliography
 Nederduitsche letteroefeningen (1834)
 Madelieven (1840)
 De avondlamp (1850)
 Sinte Godelieve, Vlaemsche legende uit de XIde eeuw (1862)
 Winterbloemen (1868)
 Najaarsvruchten (1869)
 Madelieven en avondlamp (1876)
 Najaarsvruchten en winterbloemen (1877)
 Nieuwste gedichten (1878)
 Jongste dichtbundel (1884)

See also
 Flemish literature

References

Sources

 Maria Doolaeghe
 G.J. van Bork en P.J. Verkruijsse, De Nederlandse en Vlaamse auteurs (1985)

1803 births
1884 deaths
19th-century Belgian writers
19th-century Belgian women writers
Flemish women writers
People from Diksmuide